Cornelius Lott Shear (1865–1956) was an American mycologist and plant pathologist who served as a senior pathologist at the USDA Bureau of Plant Industry.  

Shear was the first to describe the grass Bromus arizonicus.He was a pioneer in the study of pathogenic fungi who studied crop diseases and developed control measures for treatment of economically-important crops such as cranberries, grapes and cotton. He played a pivotal role in creating the American Phytopathological Society, founded in 1908.

References

American mycologists
American phytopathologists
1865 births
1956 deaths
University of Nebraska–Lincoln alumni